Üçtepe is a village in the Bulanık District of Muş Province, eastern Turkey. Its population is 247 (2021). It is 115 km from the city of Mus and 7 km from Bulanik town center.

The economy of the village is based on agriculture and animal husbandry. There is a primary school in the village, drinking water and there is electricity and fixed telephone in the village. The name Üçtepe refers to three hills.

References 

Villages in Bulanık District
Western Armenia
Kurdish settlements in Turkey